Ejegayehu Dibaba Keneni (Amharic: እጅጋዬሁ ዲባባ); born 21 March 1982, in Bekoji) is an Ethiopian long-distance runner. She won the silver medal in the 10,000 metres at the 2004 Athens Olympics. Ejegayehu earned bronze medals for the 5000 metres and 10,000 m at the 2005 World Championships in Athletics. She took gold medals in the 10,000 m at the 2003 Afro-Asian Games and All-Africa Games.

Ejegayehu comes from a sporting family of several Olympic medalists, which includes her sisters Tirunesh and Genzebe, and her cousin Derartu Tulu.

Career
Ejegayehu Dibaba is an Ethiopian long-distance runner from the high-altitude Arsi Zone of the Oromia Region. She is the third child of six. Her younger sisters Tirunesh and Genzebe are also international long-distance athletes, and brother Dejene is marked as a future star. Like her sister Tirunesh, her cousin Derartu Tulu is a double Olympic gold medallist (1992 and 2000).

Ejegayehu beat her cousin to take the silver medal in the 10,000 metres at the 2004 Summer Olympics, her two bronze medals at the IAAF World Championships in Athletics were behind her sister winning the gold in the final sprint.

She took part in a 7 km race at the Memorial Peppe Greco in September 2010 and took second place behind Sylvia Kibet.

Ejegayehu made her debut over the marathon distance at the 2011 Chicago Marathon and defeated Kayoko Fukushi by 2 minutes, 29 seconds in making her marathon debut at 2:22:09, the third fastest debut time and easy win.
Ejegayehu Dibaba is 1.60 m tall and weighs 46 kg.

International competitions

Personal bests
 3000 metres - 8:35.94 (London 2006)
 5000 metres - 14:32.74 (Bergen 2004)
 10,000 metres - 30:18.39 (Sollentuna 2005)
 Half marathon - 1:16:40 (Tequila 2001)
 Marathon - 2:22:09 (Chicago, IL 2011)

References

External links

1982 births
Living people
Ethiopian female long-distance runners
Ethiopian female marathon runners
Athletes (track and field) at the 2004 Summer Olympics
Athletes (track and field) at the 2008 Summer Olympics
Olympic athletes of Ethiopia
Olympic silver medalists for Ethiopia
Sportspeople from Oromia Region
World Athletics Championships medalists
Medalists at the 2004 Summer Olympics
World Athletics Championships athletes for Ethiopia
Chicago Marathon female winners
Olympic silver medalists in athletics (track and field)
African Games gold medalists for Ethiopia
African Games medalists in athletics (track and field)
Athletes (track and field) at the 2003 All-Africa Games